Pilcaniyeu is a village and municipality in Río Negro Province in Argentina. It is located 65 km from the city of Bariloche.

On November 30, 2015, President Cristina Fernández de Kirchner led the ceremony for the opening of a uranium-enrichment plant in the village.

Climate 

The climate is arid, cold and windy, with comparatively wetter winters.

Gallery

References

Populated places in Río Negro Province